Jason Peter Todd is a character appearing in American comic books published by DC Comics. First appearing in Batman #357 in March 1983, he was created to succeed Dick Grayson as Robin, Batman's partner and sidekick. Initially sharing a similar origin to Grayson, his character was rewritten after the Crisis on Infinite Earths event. Subsequent portrayals commonly depict Todd as an orphaned street delinquent with a troubled past and a violent demeanor, whom Batman attempts to reform and mentor.

Though initially popular, the character as written by Jim Starlin was not well received by fans following the revamping of his origin by Max Allan Collins in Batman #408–409. This led to DC Comics holding a telephone poll in 1988's "A Death in the Family" storyline to determine whether or not the character would die at the hands of Batman's nemesis, the Joker. The poll ended with a narrow majority of votes in favor of killing Todd, resulting in his death. Subsequent stories dealt with Batman's guilt over failing to save him. The character was resurrected in 2005's "Under the Hood" story arc, which saw him becoming a murderous antihero known as the Red Hood. Subsequent stories have shown Todd's on-and-off attempts to redeem himself and rebuild his relationship with Batman, with Red Hood eventually being accepted as a full member of the Batman family.

The character has made appearances in several forms of media outside of comics, including television series and video games. Jason Todd made his live-action debut in the DC Universe and HBO Max series Titans, played by Curran Walters; he appears as Robin in the first two seasons, and as Red Hood in the third season.

Publication history
By the time Len Wein took over as editor of DC Comics' Batman titles in 1982, Dick Grayson had largely moved on to starring as the leader of the young superhero team the Teen Titans in DC's New Teen Titans title. However, with the character no longer featured in Batman comics, the disadvantages of telling Batman stories without the character to act as a sounding board for the protagonist became apparent. Jason Todd was created as Dick Grayson's replacement as Robin. The character debuted in Batman #357 (March 1983) and made his first full appearance in Detective Comics #525 (April 1983), but it wasn't until later that year that he would appear in costume as Robin in Batman #366 (December 1983) when he showed up towards the end of the story to help Batman fight the Joker.

Following the 1985 limited series Crisis on Infinite Earths, DC took the opportunity to reboot many of its properties. The character was completely revamped. According to Dennis O'Neil, who took over as Batman editor in 1986, "[The fans] did hate him. I don't know if it was fan craziness—maybe they saw him as usurping Dick Grayson's position. Some of the mail response indicated that this was at least on some people's minds."

"A Death in the Family"

In 1988, Dennis O'Neil suggested that an audience might be attracted to the comics by being offered the opportunity to influence the creative process. Settling on the idea of the telephone poll via a 1-900 number, O'Neil had decided due to discussions with DC Comics president Jenette Kahn that the poll should not be wasted on something insignificant. O'Neil settled on using the poll to determine the fate of the second Robin. O'Neil said, "The logical candidate was Jason because we had reason to believe that he wasn't that popular anyway. It was a big enough stunt that we couldn't do it with a minor character." Even though Jason Todd was unpopular with readers, O'Neil could not decide what to do with the character, so he opted to present the choice to the readership.

The vote was set up in the four-part story "A Death in the Family" that was published in Batman #426–429 in 1988. At the end of Batman #427, Jason was beaten by the Joker and left to die in an explosion. The inside back cover of the issue listed two 1–900 numbers that readers could call to vote for the character's death or survival. Within the 36 hours allotted for voting, the poll received 10,614 votes. The verdict in favor of the character's death won by a slim 72-vote margin of 5,343 votes to 5,271. The following issue, Batman #428, was published featuring Todd's death. Years later, O'Neil said hundreds of votes in the "Jason Dies" line might have come from a single person, adding a large degree of uncertainty to the honesty of results regarding a poll designed to determine the character's popularity. "I heard it was one guy, who programmed his computer to dial the thumbs down number every ninety seconds for eight hours, who made the difference", O'Neil said in a Newsarama interview conducted alongside writer Judd Winick during the "Under The Hood" arc.

O'Neil would later repeat the claim with further specifics: "I heard it was a lawyer who was using a Macintosh and lived in California—I obviously don't have hard information on this, but I heard someone out there programmed his computer to dial it every couple of minutes, and since there was only about 65 votes that made the difference if that story is true, that guy, that guy killed Jason Todd!"

Despite the poll results, O'Neil noted, "We did the deed, and we got a blast of hate mail and a blast of negative commentary in the press." A few comics creators voiced their displeasure at the event. Writer/artist Frank Miller, who had worked on Batman: The Dark Knight Returns and Batman: Year One, said, "To me, the whole killing of Robin thing was probably the ugliest thing I've seen in comics, and the most cynical." However, DC stood behind the outcome of the poll. O'Neil was quoted on the back cover of A Death in the Family trade paperback collecting the story with Todd's death as saying, "It would be a really sleazy stunt to bring him back." O'Neil would later regret his comment.

There was a degree of discontinuity between the Batman and Detective Comics titles with regards to the portrayal of Jason. A lot of adventures occurred post-Crisis which fit with the circus acrobat era and in some cases ran simultaneously in Detective as the street kid origin was being laid out in Batman. This led to a blackout of almost any Robin appearances in Detective. This became especially apparent after his death. Eleven months passed between Jason's death in Batman #428 and the first mention of his passing in Detective Comics #606.

In 1989, Denny O'Neil, Marv Wolfman, and Pat Broderick would introduce Tim Drake as the third Robin. Mindful of the poor reception Jason received from readers, O'Neil arranged for a more nuanced introduction in which Tim first introduced himself to Dick Grayson and impressed the former Robin with his skills, and was revealed to share a history with Grayson. Batman himself would slowly grow to accept Tim as his new partner, although the memory of Jason would play a heavy part in how Batman trained Tim in the months building up to his official appearance as Robin.

"Hush" and reintroduction
Before the release of Batman #617 (September 2003), a page of art from the issue by artist Jim Lee circulated on the Internet, apparently revealing the mystery villain Hush, who was the focus of Lee and writer Jeph Loeb's "Hush" storyline, as a resurrected Jason. The following month's Batman #618 (October 2003) revealed that the appearance of Todd was a ruse by the villain Clayface under the direction of the Riddler and Hush. Loeb explained, "I always liked Jason, liked the idea that Batman had a Robin who died in the line of duty and how that would motivate anyone to continue their quest. It would also be the most recent, most painful thing he had to endure. That's why Hush played the card—to get inside Batman's head... But 'Hush' wasn't about Jason—Jason was a pawn to be moved around the table... If someone else wanted to tell another Jason story or bring him back and we at least opened the door, that's great!"

In 2005, writer Judd Winick began the Under the Hood storyline that revolved around the mystery of the identity of the new Red Hood. The character's identity was revealed as Jason Todd in Batman #638. Winick explained that after his initial arc on the Batman title, he suggested doing "something big" to his editors. Specifically, he wanted to bring the character back from the dead. Winick said, "I was less interested in the how and the why and the what of Jason Todd returning from the dead than I am about what Jason's return will do to Batman. Now."

The explanation for the character's return was revealed in Batman Annual #25 (2006). After a storyline in Nightwing as part of the One Year Later event where Todd took the mantle of Nightwing for himself, the character reappeared in his Red Hood persona as one of the focal characters of DC's year-long weekly Countdown series starting in May 2007.

"Battle for the Cowl"
In the Batman R.I.P. follow-up storyline Batman: Battle for the Cowl (2009), Jason Todd is featured as a gun-wielding vigilante. Commenting on the direction and utilization of Jason Todd in the storyline, writer and artist Tony Daniel has stated that, from this point on, Jason is a "bona fide" villain:

Timothy Drake eventually takes up the bat mantle when Dick Grayson refuses to and sets off to fight Todd, who easily defeats him. Grayson then comes to the rescue and refuses to believe Todd when he claims he has killed Drake (which he had not since current Robin Damian Wayne rescued Drake at the last moment). The two battle and Grayson eventually defeats Todd, who says that he will be seen again.

The Outlaws
On June 6, 2011, as part of DC Comics' line-wide revamp initiative, it was announced that Jason Todd would headline his title in the guise of the Red Hood. Todd acts as leader of the Outlaws, a group of antiheroes that "have several different exciting characters from the DC Universe – some we've seen before and some we haven't," Batman Group Editor Mike Marts said. The group included Roy Harper and Starfire. Red Hood and the Outlaws debuted in September 2011, written by Scott Lobdell and with art by Kenneth Rocafort. The series focused on Jason Todd's redemption and introduced a simplified version of his origin story as the Red Hood in Red Hood and the Outlaws #0, a special prequel issue between #12 and #13.

Red Hood and the Outlaws was later rebooted as part of DC's Rebirth event. This series starred a new lineup of Outlaws: Todd, Artemis of Bana-Mighdall and Bizarro, who was touted as a darker counterpart to the Trinity. This lineup lasted for 25 issues, after which Todd briefly reunited with Roy Harper and then went solo. Todd later rescues Bunker and joins forces with a new Wingman to take over Penguin's Iceberg Lounge.

Fictional character biography

Pre-Crisis on Infinite Earths

The initial version of Jason "Jay" Todd from before Crisis on Infinite Earths had an origin that was similar to the 1940 origin of the original Robin (Dick Grayson). Originally, he is the son of circus acrobats (Joseph Todd and Trina Todd, killed by a criminal named Killer Croc) and is later adopted by Bruce Wayne. Distinguished by his red hair, Todd is wearing various pieces of Dick Grayson's old childhood disguises as a costume to fight crime until Grayson presents him with a Robin costume of his own. At that point, Todd dyes his hair black, and in later stories blossoms under Batman's tutelage.

For a time Natalia Knight, the criminal also known as Nocturna, Mistress of the Night is a stabilizing influence in his life; she becomes his surrogate mother and even adopts the young Todd. Catwoman would be a frequent guest star during this era as she wrestled with the role of hero and as a love interest for Batman which led to clashes with the boy feeling left out.

In the Alan Moore epic Superman Annual #11, "For the Man Who Has Everything", Batman and Todd join Wonder Woman at the Fortress of Solitude to celebrate Superman's birthday. They arrive only to find Superman incapacitated by a mysterious creature and Mongul there to battle the heroes. Todd as Robin saves Wonder Woman, Superman, and Batman from Mongul by unleashing Mongul's hallucination-causing creature on the tyrant himself.

Post-Crisis on Infinite Earths

Origin
Following the revamp due to Crisis on Infinite Earths, Jason Todd is recast as a young street orphan who first encounters Batman while attempting to steal the tires off the Batmobile in Crime Alley, the very place where Batman's parents were murdered years before. The son of Catherine and Willis Todd, Jason lives on the east end of Gotham City in the Park Row district called Crime Alley. Catherine was a drug addict who died of an overdose sometime before he began living on the street. Willis, a former medical student, was working as hired muscle for Two-Face and had disappeared suspiciously following a botched assignment. Bruce Wayne sees to it that Todd is placed in a school for troubled youths, which turns out to be Ma Gunn's School for Crime. Jason earns the Robin mantle a short while later by helping Batman apprehend the gang of thieves. However, Todd does not wear the Robin costume until completing six months of training. Batman notes that while Todd doesn't possess Dick Grayson's natural athleticism and acrobatic skills, he can become a productive crimefighter by channeling his rage. He also believes that if he doesn't help the boy, Todd will eventually become part of the "criminal element". It is later established during the story arc Infinite Crisis that Superboy-Prime is responsible for the changes on Jason Todd's origin and character when he inadvertently created Hypertime-lines.

In the revamp period, Todd is portrayed as the "rebel" Robin, reflecting the late 1980s youth culture. He smokes, swears, and fights authority. He is prone to defying Batman's orders, sometimes to success (bringing in the Scarecrow singlehandedly) and sometimes to failure (botching a raid on a drug lab by jumping the gun too soon). Todd also aided Batman while Gotham City was temporarily overrun by Deacon Blackfire as shown in Batman: The Cult.

The most controversial moment before his death occurred in Batman #424 when serial rapist Felipe Garzonas escapes the prosecution due to his father's diplomatic immunity. One of his victims, a girl named Gloria, hangs herself amid the threat of a third rape from Felipe. Todd discovers her hanging and makes a beeline for Felipe, ahead of Batman, who arrived just in time to see Felipe take a 22-story fall to his death, with Todd as Robin at the edge of the balcony. Todd maintains "I guess I spooked him. He slipped." This highlights an earlier exchange in Batman #422 where he uses excessive force on a pimp about to slash one of his working girls and Todd asks Batman if it would have been a big loss if he had killed him. It is left ambiguous whether Todd killed him.

In Batman #425, the Dynamic Duo is challenged by Felipe's father, who kidnaps Commissioner Gordon in retaliation for his son's death. Batman is instructed to meet the kidnappers at a city junkyard and to bring Robin. Batman does not wish to involve Todd and keeps this information from him. However, Robin senses something is wrong and hides in the Batmobile's trunk as Batman heads to the junkyard. There, Batman is unable to reach Gordon, surrounded by Garzonas' men, and Todd intervenes, saving Batman from a close call. Machine gun fire breaks out and Gordon is wounded in the arm. All of the henchmen die, and Garzonas is finally crushed by a pile of junk cars.

Death

In 1988's "A Death in the Family" storyline, Jason Todd discovers that Catherine Todd was not his biological mother, and runs away to find the woman who gave birth to him. After following several leads, including an Israeli Mossad agent and Shiva Woo-San, Todd finally tracks his biological mother Sheila Haywood to Ethiopia, where she works as an aid worker. While Todd is overjoyed to be reunited with his real mother, he soon discovers that she is being blackmailed by the Joker using her to provide him with medical supplies. Sheila herself has been embezzling from the aid agency and as part of the cover-up, she hands her son, having arrived as Robin, over to Joker. Joker beats the boy brutally with a crowbar and then leaves him and Sheila in the warehouse with a time bomb. Sheila and Jason try desperately to get out of the warehouse but are still inside as the bomb goes off. Batman arrives too late to save them and finds Jason's lifeless body in the rubble. Sheila lives just long enough to tell Batman that Jason died trying to protect her. The bodies are taken back to Gotham City for burial. Todd's death continued to haunt Batman afterward, as he considered it his greatest failure. He keeps the second Robin's uniform on display in the Batcave as a reminder. The Joker, on the other hand, would occasionally remind Batman of this loss to torment him.

Return from the grave
Years later, while trying to discover the identity of a mysterious figure plotting against him, Batman discovers that Tim Drake, Jason's successor as Robin, has been kidnapped. He confronts the kidnapper and is stunned to discover that he is an adult Todd, standing at his own desecrated gravesite, and wearing a redesigned and darker version of his Robin costume. Batman subdues this mystery "Jason" and discovers that it is only Clayface impersonating Todd, concluding that "Jason's" greater physical age was to hide the flaws in Clayface's impersonation by allowing him to partially mimic Nightwing's combat skills. However, Todd's actual body is missing from its grave.

It is later revealed that Todd had indeed died at the hands of the Joker. However, when Superboy-Prime alters reality from the paradise dimension in which he is trapped—his punches against the barrier keeping him from the rest of the universe causing temporal ripples that create an overlap of parallel timelines (Hypertime)—Jason Todd is restored to life (as he was meant to survive the Joker's assaults), breaks out of his coffin, and is eventually hospitalized; because he wandered so far from his grave before his discovery, no connection was ever drawn between the two events. Todd never turns up on any missing person reports—as he was never 'missing'—nor can he be identified since no prints are on file for him. After spending a year in a coma and subsequently another year as an amnesiac vagrant, he is taken by Talia al Ghul after a small-time crook recognizes him as Robin due to his combat skills on the street.

Talia took Todd in out of her love for Batman, while her father Ra's al Ghul was interested in the secret behind his resurrection. The League of Assassins tracked and eliminated everyone in Gotham who knew of Todd's resurrection to prevent Batman from finding out. They also interrogated Joker's henchmen who were with him during Todd's murder, in hopes to find out how the boy could have survived. Talia later restored Todd's health and memory by immersing him in a Lazarus Pit in which her father was also bathing and helped him escape the House of al Ghul. It is suggested by Ra's that the power of the pit resulted in Todd's mental instability. Ra's refers to Todd as a "curse" and a "pestilence" unleashed on the planet, saying that madness may affect him for "hours, months, or decades".

Using the money from Talia and infuriated by her statement that he "remains unavenged", Todd paid a group of mercenaries to help him return to Gotham. Upon arriving, he enacts a plan to get revenge on Batman, whom he resents for refusing to kill the Joker and thus avenge his death.

The Lost Days
Jason Todd creates a false arms trafficking of advanced military arsenal, knowing that Batman would respond. This provides Jason an opportunity to plant a bomb beneath the Batmobile while Batman is on a stakeout for the arms deal. Batman enters the car and is at Jason's mercy, detonator in hand. However, Todd realizes that if he went through with it, his former mentor would never know about his return nor the identity of his killer. Todd instead decides to kill Batman directly by traveling across the globe in search of a similar, but the deadlier type of training to Bruce Wayne's own to prepare for that day. For years, Todd learns various skills from various masters, assassins, mercenaries, and aviators around the globe, including guns, poisons and antitoxins, martial arts, acrobatics, and bomb-making. Upon learning that the man training him in lethal combat is also the leader of a child sex slave ring, Jason frees the latest shipment of children and takes them to a local embassy, then returns to the training compound and poisons his new mentor for his crimes. Upon being questioned by Talia al Ghul, Todd says it was not murder but rather that he "put down a reptile". Jason has since repeated the same pattern of killing his teachers when finding them guilty after he has finished with his training.

During his journey, Jason discovers his Robin replacement was Timothy "Tim" Drake, which further torments him. He also learns that the man teaching him bomb-making is involved in a Russian mafia-backed deal meant to push the resources of British law-enforcement away from mob crime and onto Islamic extremist terrorism with a framed bombing plot. Todd manages to hunt down the gang and safely detonate the bombs. Ironically, the only surviving member of the gang offers Jason the possibility of a large government payday in exchange for his life, because he knows where a very wanted man is. That wanted man turns out to be the Joker.

After learning of the Joker's arms deal in Los Angeles for another terrorism scheme against Gotham, Jason begins to stalk the villain as a masked assassin. After successfully capturing Joker (who fails to recognize him due to being older), Jason contemplates burning his killer alive after dousing him with gasoline. However, Jason realizes that he does not simply want Joker to die, but desires to punish the villain with Batman. Jason spares Joker and decides to wait for the right opportunity. Jason also admits to Talia that he has already deduced that the reason she finances his training is to stall him from killing Batman, but he has no desire to kill his former mentor anymore. Talia then gives Todd the idea to be the Batman that Gotham needs. She also hires the same carpenters who built Jason's casket and had them build a replica of it (the original was destroyed and beyond repair after Jason emerged from it). Todd enters into a pact with Hush and the Riddler. He confirms to Hush that Riddler is correct and that Bruce Wayne is Batman. As Hush, Riddler, and Jason collaborate, Jason initially confronts Batman at his gravesite. Jason then switches places with Clayface to observe Batman from afar. When Batman expresses no remorse for sparing Joker's life after the second Robin was killed, Todd is further angered and takes up his murderer's original mantle. After she initiated a takeover of Kord Industries for him, Talia gifts Jason the flame dagger (a replica of the one Ra's al Ghul often carried) and the red motorcycle-helmet based hood which become his signature weapon and mask.

Red Hood

A Robin-bearing mask is found in the Batmobile, which never belonged to Dick or Tim, but is of the style that Todd wore as Robin, suggesting that he'd been stalking Batman. Shortly after the events of "War Games" and just before "War Crimes", Jason Todd reappears in Gotham City as the Red Hood. He hijacks a shipment of Kryptonite from Black Mask, and in the midst of a battle with Batman, Nightwing and Mr. Freeze, Red Hood gives them the Kryptonite back, and tells them he has gotten what he truly wanted: a "lay of the land". Shortly afterward, Red Hood finds the Joker (driven out of Gotham by Hush) and beats him with a crowbar just as Joker had beaten Jason.  Despite the violence of the beating, Jason spares Joker, intending to use him later against Batman.

Red Hood assumes control over several gangs in Gotham City and starts a one-man war against Black Mask's criminal empire, who himself had recently murdered a Robin (Stephanie Brown). Overall, he strives to take over Gotham's gangs, control their activities, and kill Joker in revenge for his death. In his new role as Gotham's most powerful crime lord, he repeatedly comes to blows with Batman and several of his allies. After several confrontations, Batman becomes obsessed with the possibility of resurrection from the dead, suspecting that it was Jason he fought, and seeks advice from allies such as Superman and Green Arrow, both of whom have died and returned to life. Around this time, Batman discovers that the empty coffin buried at Jason's gravesite is a replica of what he bought. After a series of tests confirmed that it is Jason, Batman remains to keep his Robin costume in its memorial display case in the Batcave regardless; when Alfred Pennyworth asks if he wants the costume removed, Batman sadly replies that the return of Todd "doesn't change anything at all" because of wanting to remember Jason as he was when they first met and in guilt over how violent he has become.

Acting on his obsession with Tim Drake, Todd breaks into Titans Tower to confront the third Robin, thus revealing the truth of their encounter at the cemetery to his successor. Having learned that Tim defeated the Joker by himself in their first fights, Jason seeks to best him in combat. Wearing another version of his Robin costume, Todd quickly immobilizes the other Teen Titans and strikes Drake down in the Tower's Hall of Fallen Titans. Furious that no memorial statue was made for him (despite his short tenure as a Titan), he demands that Drake tell him if he is as good as Todd has been told. Drake says "Yes" and passes out. As he leaves, he tears the 'R' emblem from Drake's chest, though he later grudgingly acknowledges that Drake is a worthy successor. Todd is also left wondering if perhaps he would have been a better Robin and better person had he had had a life like Drake's and friends like the Titans.

Todd eventually kidnaps and holds Joker hostage, luring Batman to Crime Alley, the site of their first meeting. Despite their now-antagonistic relationship, Batman desperately wants to help Todd and intends to atone for his failures. Todd asks Batman why he has not avenged his death by killing Joker, a psychopath who has murdered countless people and crippled one of their best friends, arguing that Batman should have done it "because he took me away from you". Batman admits that he has often been tempted by the thought of taking the Joker somewhere private to torture for weeks before finally killing the maniac, but says that he refuses to go to that place. Todd then offers Batman an ultimatum: he will kill Joker unless Batman kills Todd first. Holding Joker at gunpoint, he throws a pistol at Batman and begins to count to three while standing behind Joker, leaving Batman with only a headshot if he wants to stop Todd from pulling the trigger. At the last moment, Batman throws a batarang at Todd, which bounces off a pipe and sinks into his neck causing him to drop his gun. Joker takes advantage of the situation, detonating nearby explosives that engulf the platform and send them plunging into the bay.

Nightwing
Jason Todd resurfaces following the "One Year Later" period, patrolling the streets of New York City as a murderous version of Nightwing. However, Jason shows no intention of giving up the Nightwing persona when confronted by Dick Grayson and continues to taunt his predecessor by wearing the costume and suggesting that the two become a crime-fighting team. Not long after the two Nightwings meet up, Todd is captured and imprisoned by local mobsters Barry and Buddy Pierce. Grayson reluctantly rescues him, and the two join forces to defeat the Pierce Brothers. Shortly afterward, Todd leaves New York City and the Nightwing mantle to Grayson, along with a telegram telling Grayson he has returned to normal and still considers himself a gift from Batman.

Red Hood again
Jason Todd resumes his persona as the Red Hood and appears in several issues of Green Arrow alongside Brick as part of a gun-running organization, which brings Batman to Star City. Jason's true motives are shown in the third part as he kidnaps Mia Dearden to dissolve her partnership with Green Arrow, feeling that they are kindred spirits, cast down by society and at odds with their mentors. The two fight while Todd discusses the insanity of heroes for placing child sidekicks in danger. Mia is deeply troubled by the discussion but ultimately decides to remain with Green Arrow.

At the start of Countdown, Todd rescues a woman from Duela Dent. After a Monitor shoots and kills Duela, he attempts to kill Jason, but is stopped by a second Monitor. This second Monitor apologizes to Jason before they both disappear, leaving Jason alone with Duela's body. Later, at Duela's funeral, Jason hides until all of the Teen Titans have left except Donna Troy. Jason tells her what happened the night of Duela's death, and about the dueling Monitors. He knows that both he and Donna Troy have come back from the dead, even already deducing that his resurrection has something to do with Alexander Luthor, Jr.'s plans during Infinite Crisis, and wonders which of them is next on the Monitor's hit list. The two are then attacked by the Forerunner, but before she can kill them, the apologetic Monitor stops her and recruits Jason and Donna for a mission to the Palmerverse, a section of the Nanoverse discovered by Ray Palmer, in an attempt to find Palmer. During the trip, Jason takes it upon himself to name the Monitor "Bob". Jason seems to have a romantic interest in Donna and is shown to be visibly disgruntled when her old boyfriend Kyle Rayner joins their group as they take their tour to the 52 Earths which comprise the Multiverse.

Red Robin

A teaser image released to promote Countdown showed a figure resembling Red Robin among assembled heroes in poses symbolic of their roles in the series. After a series of contradictory statements about this figure, executive editor Dan DiDio firmly stated in the July 2007 DC Nation column that the figure is Jason Todd. The Red Robin costume, originally designed by Alex Ross for the 1996 Kingdom Come limited series and worn by the Earth-22 Dick Grayson, is seen in Countdown to Final Crisis #16 in the Earth-51 Batman's base of operations; it is revealed that Earth-51 became the peaceful world it is because the Batman of this Earth killed all the supervillains after his Jason was killed by the Joker. In issue #14, Jason dons the Red Robin suit—described by Earth-51's Batman as something he was going to give Todd's counterpart when he was older—and goes into battle alongside Earth-51 Batman. During a battle with a group of Monarch's soldiers, Earth-51 Batman is killed by the Ultraman of Earth-3, deeply affecting Jason. In his grief, Todd kills an alternate version of the Joker, also involved in Batman's killing, who then mocks his loss, vacating alongside Donna, Ray, and Kyle to the planet Apokolips before Earth-51's destruction.

After the group is sent back to Earth, Todd leaves the group and returns to his crime-fighting ways. When the Morticoccus virus is released from Karate Kid's body, he is forcibly brought back to the group by Kyle, much to his dismay. When the Challengers return to New Earth, Todd disposes of his Red Robin costume and abandons the rest of the group, though they go on to declare to the Monitors that they are now the monitors of the Monitors. Todd and Drake are confronted by another Red Robin in Robin (vol. 2) #177, whose identity is initially a mystery but later turns out to be Ulysses Armstrong. Due to a combination of Red Robin's involvement and a gun-toting gang member, Todd was shot in the leg and arrested by police. Upon the resolution of the gang war in Gotham, Drake under a pseudonym visited Todd in prison to give him the Justice League access code to release himself from prison. Todd is booked under a pseudonym (John Doe), due to there being no identifiable prints on file for any member of the main bat heroes as well as Jason is still legally dead. Following his escape, Todd continues on the mend and is summoned by Tim Drake to come to the Batcave, where Batman has left a last will statement for him. After hearing the statement in private, Todd prepares to leave, not revealing what he was told, although he does pause before his old costume and the tattered remains of Batman's, he is sad.

Batman
Jason Todd reappeared in the "Battle for the Cowl" series. Dressed in a version of a Batman costume, Todd is also living/operating out of an abandoned Gotham subway system. His inner monologue reveals that he had always wanted to eventually replace Batman, and thinks it was a bad idea for Batman to become a public figure, rather than an urban legend.

After stabbing Tim Drake in the chest with a Batarang, he and Dick Grayson battle down in the subway. Nightwing still wants to save Todd, but Todd refuses the offer, and instead allows himself to fall off a speeding subway into the Gotham River while stating they would see each other again soon. This allowed Grayson to officially take up the mantle of Batman.

It is later revealed in Battle for the Cowl that Bruce Wayne's last words to Jason were of regret at how he had overlooked the young man's deep emotional problems. He thought he could do what could never be done for him and 'make him whole'. His message goes on to plead that Todd gets psychiatric help, a notion that the latter rejects. It is suggested by Dick Grayson that Todd was infuriated by Wayne's last words, a reaction that led him to become monstrous, murdering Batman in that same arc. Plus, it aggravated his hatred towards the Bat family, as he repeatedly attempts to kill members of it.

Red Hood and Scarlet
In the second story arc of Batman and Robin by Grant Morrison and Philip Tan, Jason Todd retakes the Red Hood mantle after losing his bid to become the new Batman. To make the very concept of Batman obsolete, he puts a lot of effort into public relations: he drastically alters his Red Hood costume to look more like a traditional superhero outfit and recruits his sidekick Scarlet. In their war on crime, Red Hood and Scarlet freely kill criminals, villains, and anyone who gets in their way, even the police. He leaves behind a calling card that states "let the punishment fit the crime". He describes his vendetta against Grayson as "the revenge of one crazy man in a mask on another crazy man in a mask".

Todd has reappeared with red hair, claiming that he is a natural red-head and that Bruce Wayne had him dye his hair black to look like Dick Grayson. He also claims the white streak of hair that he got is from being resurrected in the Lazarus Pit, though the white streak disappears again. In the issue, Todd is characterized as increasingly unstable and his idea of "finishing off" Batman and Robin now consists of stripping them down to their underwear and exposing their identities via webcam activated by a phone poll [a nod by Morrison to his death poll]. A fight between Batman, Robin, and the Flamingo – a foreign hitman hired by a Mexican cartel after Red Hood killed their operative in Gotham – ends with Jason burying Flamingo in debris with a bulldozer. Flamingo is assumed dead, although Commissioner Gordon reports that his body cannot be recovered from beneath the rubble.

Grayson offers to rehabilitate Todd who, in a moment of clarity, tells Grayson it is too late for him, and how he tried to be what Batman wanted, "but this world... this dirty, twisted, cruel and ugly dungheap had... other plans for me". He then proceeds to fall back into his hero persona, ranting how he did what Batman never did. He "defeated his archenemy". Todd is arrested by Gordon who informs him that the reason he has always worked with Batman is that Batman never violates the law "where it counts". As Gordon leads him away, Todd tauntingly asks Grayson why he has not put Wayne's corpse into a Lazarus Pit to bring him back, citing his resurrection from its bath. Scarlet flees Gotham, her mask finally falling from her face as she exits the city limits.

Jason files an appeal to be moved from Arkham Asylum where he has been held for observation for the last several months. Bruce Wayne as Batman visits him there to inform Jason he's in Arkham for his protection. Jason points out he's passed all the psychological tests repeatedly and there is no reason to keep him in what he calls Batman's "kennel of freaks". It is also revealed that, like Tim, Jason was also aware that Batman survived his encounter with Darkseid. Jason is transferred to a Gotham prison and upon his arrival, the suicide rate spikes amongst top incarcerated crime figures there. Several homicides occur due to many botched attempts on Jason's life by inmates with a grudge against Red Hood's tactics. Jason escalates things further by poisoning the cafeteria, killing 82 and sickening 100 more inmates. He is immediately transferred back to Arkham but is broken out of the paddy wagon by a group of mercenaries. The mercs reveal they are under orders to bring Jason to the person that hired them and that he is in no danger. Jason breaks free and fights them off all the same as Batman and Robin arrive. Once the hired guns are subdued they reveal their employer has captured Scarlet, Jason's former sidekick. Dick, Damian, and Jason go to one of the Red Hood's weapon caches where he assembles a composite costume made from his biker and "superhero" Red Hood attire. The three intend to rescue Scarlet. After Batman and Robin defeat the mercs, Red Hood rescues Scarlet and escapes using the helicopter. Batman and Robin attempt to chase him, but Red Hood tells them that he planted bombs over Gotham City months ago. Scarlet desires to stay with Red Hood as his partner. Red Hood and Scarlet head towards an unknown destination.

The New 52

Origin
In September 2011, The New 52 rebooted DC's continuity. In this new timeline, Jason's new origin is revealed in a special Red Hood and the Outlaws #0 (November 2012) issue, which changes how Batman first met Todd (stealing medicine from Leslie Thompkins, after she had treated him from a brutal beating). The backup introduces a massive retcon in which the Joker is responsible for orchestrating the major moments of Todd's life such as his father's imprisonment and death, his mother's overdose, his introduction to Thompkins, and his adoption of the Robin identity. Considering the Joker is the one narrating this segment, it is open to debate whether he is telling the truth or not. Though only lightly touched on, his resurrection is also simplified: he is resurrected with a  Lazarus Pit by Talia al Ghul (as Infinite Crisis did not occur in this timeline).

The Outlaws

Following the events of the "Flashpoint" storyline, the DC universe was relaunched, with Red Hood becoming the leader of the Outlaws in their series, part of the New 52 line of comics. The team also includes Starfire and Roy Harper. Instead of being trained by various men after his return from the dead, Jason Todd was trained by an order of warriors known as the All Caste. He was a part of the order for an unknown amount of time before he was exiled, partly of his own will. After his exile, he became Red Hood and came to be at odds with Dick Grayson, Starfire's ex-lover, and his Robin predecessor. He soon tires of Gotham and leaves, gathering the group together; after breaking out Roy from a Middle Eastern prison, he brings Roy up to speed on things. The two start on very friendly terms. Roy and Starfire are in a sexual relationship. However, Starfire makes it clear to Roy that it is only physical, with no emotional ties. Essence, a fellow exiled member of the All Caste whom Jason knows, appears to him but is invisible to others. She sets Jason on a mission to hunt down a group known as "The Untitled", telling him of people missing organs before death without any sign of removal, which is their calling card. To top it off, Essence shows that the order of the All Caste, the people most qualified to handle the situation, have been slaughtered, leaving her and Jason as the only known survivors. After finding out he's no longer the killer he once was, Jason brings his group to the All Caste headquarters, the Hundred Acres of All, where they discover the bodies are returning to life as zombies. Jason is forced to destroy the bodies of his teachers and friends. Afterward, he pays his respects, swearing vengeance for them. He is led on a wild goose chase across the globe. Eventually, he comes across an Untitled, who was in hiding, who tells him that they were set up but still fights him. Jason kills the creature, strengthening his resolve.

Todd has also been revealed to be a member of Batman, Incorporated, initially operating under the name of Wingman, an agent-based in Europe. Wingman temporarily allies himself with Damian Wayne, who is using the name "Redbird" at the time. Batman, Inc is at war with an organization named Leviathan, headed by Talia al Ghul, Damian's mother and the woman responsible for reviving Jason, but in the present, she seeks to destroy Batman and has put a bounty on their son's head. Alfred Pennyworth refers to Jason as wanting "to be redeemed" through his membership. Later, however, the Wingman ruse is exposed and Todd returns to being Red Hood. While he recalls his days as Wingman as a failure, Bruce Wayne is nevertheless proud of him. Following the events of Death of the Family, Bruce and Alfred care for a sick Jason in the Manor, culminating in a warm embrace between Jason and his father figure as he regains consciousness, suggesting that their animosity might finally be put to rest. After Jason recovers and in the wake of Damian's death, Batman partners with Jason for the first time since Jason's days as Robin. Batman brings Jason on a mission in Ethiopia to punish some of Damian's other would-be assassins, and while there he also takes him to the place of his death in the hopes Jason can provide insights into his resurrection so that he might apply the method to Damian. Jason is hurt by Batman's manipulation, and the two share harsh words and exchange blows, shattering their newfound relationship. Later, however, the pair come together, united by the ties of family. Jason teams up with Batman, Batgirl, Cyborg and Red Robin to rescue Damian's body from Apokolips. They are successful, and Damian is resurrected, sharing a warm reunion with Jason and the family.

Following the traumas of Death of the Family, Damian's death, and his betrayal by Batman, Jason returns to the All-Caste and has his memories wiped so that he may be at peace. He is 'rescued' by Starfire and Arsenal, but does not regain his memories. He subsequently learns of his history from Starfire's computer, which states Red Hood has made 83 confirmed kills. Jason refuses to believe from Starfire and Arsenal that he had been on a path towards redemption and abandons his teammates.

Red Hood/Arsenal

Following the conclusion of the first volume of Red Hood and the Outlaws, a new series starring Red Hood teaming up with Arsenal as heroes for hire began entitled Red Hood/Arsenal. The series eventually ended coinciding with the DC Rebirth event.

DC Comics Rebirth

Red Hood and the Outlaws

The DC Rebirth introduced the revival of Red Hood and the Outlaws with a second volume released in August 2016. Jason Todd's backstory is altered to resemble his post-Crisis meeting with Batman occurring while trying to steal tires from the Batmobile. Jason's mother is already dead by now and his father is serving a life sentence in prison, so he has been living on the streets. Batman at first tries to help him by enrolling him in Ma Gunn's boarding school, trying to give him a home. However, he does not realize that Ma Gunn is using the school as a cover to recruit young delinquents into her criminal gang. When Batman discovers this, he takes down Ma Gunn, with help from Jason.

Batman then takes him in and raises him as the new Robin, though realizes early on that Jason has a violent streak. After Jason is killed by the Joker and resurrected in the Lazarus Pit, he goes on to become the Red Hood, straining his relationship with Batman. The new team consists of Jason Todd as Red Hood, the disgraced Amazon warrior named Artemis, and the Superman clone called Bizarro. This team is referred to as DC's "Dark Trinity" in comparison to the new Trinity series included in DC Rebirth which follows Batman, Superman, and Wonder Woman. The team would stay together until Red Hood and the Outlaws (vol. 2) #25-26, where Jason went solo after his team disappeared and the title was changed to Red Hood: Outlaw. He also later appears in Year of the Villain and Event Leviathan #2.

Skills and abilities
Similarly to Batman and Nightwing before him, Jason Todd typically possess no inherent super-powers and relies on natural abilities, skills, and technology;  During his time as Robin and under Batman's training (as well as Nightwing), Jason was initially considered a first-class athlete and a capable hand-to-hand combatant. His detective and reasoning skills were considered weak despite showcasing some potential. Over time, Jason developed his skills, becoming adept in various forms of martial arts (Aikido, Capoeira, Karate, Ninjutsu, Savate, Krav Maga, Kickboxing, Silat, and Taekwondo) and eventually developed keen detective skills. Jason was also taught by Batman in the use of firearms in training comparable to law enforcement agencies' requirements such as police departments or the Federal Bureau of Investigation, as required for crimefighting and forensics, despite not using this skill typically when he was Robin.

After the character's resurrection, Jason's skills became more advanced and received more training (details depending on continuity); in modern stories, his training has included the mystical All-Caste order and the League of Assassins, having learned under premier instructors in the latter such as Bronze Tiger and Lady Shiva. In addition to his prior skills (such as being a skilled gynmast and skilled detective), Jason is also considered an expert marksman with various firearms. To hone this ability, he went a step further than Batman on his journey around the world to learn from masters how to kill a target with different types of guns, possess considerable "street smarts", and is remarked to be a natural leader. It is also expressed that due to his resurrection at the hands of the Lazarus Pit, the character possesses a few magical abilities. However, during DC's Rebirth, these abilities have seemingly disappeared for the most part.

Equipment 
For a time, through Talia al Ghul's access to Kord Industries, as well as being LexCorp's former CEO, Jason has access to high-level weaponry and advanced computer equipment and gadgetry. However, his dagger remains his preferred weapon of choice for hand-to-hand combat; it can cut through Batman's armor and arsenal. Having been trained in the use of Batman's batarangs in perfect aim, he has some lethally sharpened shurikens based on his former mentor's designs as throwing weapons. His weapons of choice are a pair of customized IWI Jericho 941s, fitted with extra Picatinny rails and mini red-dot sights.

After receiving training from the All-Caste, Jason received a pair of magic knives called the All-blades which are large bronze knives capable of slaying magical foes, but are harmless against mundane enemies. The blades magically appear in Jason’s hands when needed.

Alternative versions

The Dark Knight Returns

Batman: The Dark Knight Returns, which was published before "A Death in the Family", references Jason Todd. Jason Todd is implied to have died in the line of duty, although the exact details are not given. It is implied that Todd's death was a contributing factor to Batman's retirement. When Batman allows Carrie Kelley to assume the mantle of Robin, Alfred Pennyworth objects, citing Todd as a reason. Batman responds by stating "I will never forget Jason. He was a good soldier. He honored me. But the war goes on."

The details of Jason's death are revealed in the comic book one-shot Dark Knight Returns: The Last Crusade, by the first series' author Frank Miller with Brian Azzarello, and art by John Romita, Jr. Romita reveals that the Joker, like in the "A Death in the Family" story arc, plays an important role in Jason Todd's demise in Miller's Dark Knight Universe. It was released on June 15, 2016. After Jason defeats and captures the Joker; the villain becomes fixated on him. After the Joker again escapes from Arkham Asylum, Jason tracks his whereabouts on his own and is brutally beaten to death by the Joker's men under his order.

Earth-Two concept

In an interview for the Infinite Crisis hardcover, Jeanine Schaefer states that Geoff Johns had planned to reveal the second Red Hood as the Jason Todd of the Earth-Two universe. Said, Schaefer:

Batman: The Brave and the Bold
In an issue of The All-New Batman: The Brave and the Bold, Phantom Stranger summons all of the Robins, including Jason, Tim Drake, Carrie Kelley, Damian Wayne, Nightwing, and Stephanie Brown, to save Batman. At first, Jason refuses to take orders from Nightwing or work with the other Robins, but Damian threatens him by telling him that he knows his fate and can make it happen sooner than expected, referencing his death in the comics. Nightwing notes that Jason fights aggressively like he's angry at the world and doesn't hold back.

"Flashpoint"

An alternate version of Jason appears in the timeline of the 2011 "Flashpoint" storyline, where, among other changes, Bruce Wayne was killed as a child and thus never became Batman. Here Jason is portrayed as a former drug addict and follower of Brother Blood who eventually turned his life around and became a priest. He still died but was eventually resurrected and recovered from it physically and mentally.

A World Without Young Justice
In this alternate timeline, there appeared a version of Jason. He is a black-haired circus kid with criminal acrobats as parents (Willis and Catherine Todd) who worked for Killer Croc. He is killed during this storyline by his ex-girlfriend (an alternate version of Empress) on behalf of his stepmother Catherine.

Amalgam
In the Amalgam Universe, Jason Todd was a young S.H.I.E.L.D. recruit with a bright future, who was personally mentored by Director Bruce Wayne and Moonwing. Despite his reckless nature, Dick chose Jason as his successor when he temporarily left S.H.I.E.L.D. to attend college. As Moonwing, he made a careless mistake, which resulted in a S.H.I.E.L.D. agent's death, causing him to be dismissed from S.H.I.E.L.D. Jason became furious and blamed his mentors. He was then caught in an explosion when the villain Hyena detonated a bomb intended to kill Bruce and Dark Claw. Despite his body never being recovered, S.H.I.E.L.D. presumed he was dead, but he survived and his body was recovered by HYDRA, who replaced his damaged body parts with robotic parts, transforming him into Deathlok. He then participated in a coup to help Madame Cat overthrow the Supreme Leader of Hydra, Lex Luthor a.k.a. Green Skull. Afterward, he swore allegiance to her. Later, when S.H.I.E.L.D. agents launched an attack on HYDRA's base, Deathlok was sent to confront them, where he spotted his former mentor, Moonwing, and attacked him from behind. He then revealed that he's been waiting a long time to kill both Dick and Logan. He then unmasked Moonwing and accused him and Logan of abandoning him. He then began strangling Dick, but before he could kill him Colonel Nick Fury and Sergeant Joe Rock commandeered an aircraft and shot Deathlok several times in the back. Despite feeling sorry for Jason, Dick left Jason to die again so he could continue the attack on the HYDRA base.

The storyline is notable because it was published ten years before the confirmation of Jason Todd's resurrection.

DC Bombshells
In the DC Bombshells continuity, Jasón was a child from the Basque Country in Spain who aided Kate Kane and Renee Montoya during the Spanish Civil War. Kate called him her "pettirojo" (Robin) and her "Capucho Rojo" (Red Hood). Jasón was the rebellion's mascot, often carrying their flag and using his street smarts to help Kate and Renee in various scenarios. He is eventually shot and killed by Cheetah during one of their battles. Batwoman told Huntress of his story in an attempt to convince her not to risk her life so often through rebellion.

In the Bombshells United storyline, Kate Kane and Renee Montoya meet Talia al Ghul and Cheetah in an underground labyrinth. Cheetah regrets her past deeds and resurrects Jasón using a Lazarus Pit. Though the group is happy for a time, Jasón begins to become belligerent and regret being resurrected. Upon meeting another man who had previously been brought back by the Lazarus Pit and had turned into a Minotaur, he realizes a similar fate will befall him the longer he stays alive. After bidding everyone farewell, he, the Minotaur, and the similarly resurrected Isis commit suicide by walking back into the Lazarus Pit.

Batman: Arkham 

Jason Todd is featured in Batman: Arkham Knight – Genesis, a comic book miniseries set in the universe of the Batman: Arkham games, which provides the backstory to the character's role in 2015's Batman: Arkham Knight. Similar to his mainstream counterpart (Post-Crisis on Infinite Earths), this version of Jason was originally a young orphan living on the streets and met Batman while attempting to steal the Batmobile's tires. His tenure as the second Robin was short-lived because he was captured by the Joker, who wanted to break his will and make him turn on Batman. The Joker tortured Jason for over a year in an abandoned wing of Arkham Asylum while filming himself, and eventually convinced the broken Todd that Batman had abandoned and replaced him. As Jason attempted to reveal Batman's identity, the Joker shot him, seemingly killing him. He later sent all the footage of himself torturing and eventually shooting Jason to Batman to torment him. However, Jason secretly survived the gunshot thanks to the hidden body armor he was wearing at the time, and the Joker would continue to keep him captive at Arkham, eventually hiring Deathstroke to watch over him.

During the events of the series' first installment, Jason convinces Deathstroke to help him by offering him a bigger sum than what the Joker is currently paying him. After escaping from Arkham, Jason hacks into one of Bruce Wayne's bank accounts, using part of the money to pay Deathstroke, while keeping the rest for himself. Over the following two years, he plans his revenge against Batman with Deathstroke's help. At one point, during the events of Batman: Arkham City, Jason encounters the Joker again, but spares him after the villain reveals that he deliberately allowed Jason to escape and has been using Deathstroke to guide him in his quest for vengeance. Later, Jason adopts the "Arkham Knight" identity and uses his remaining wealth to employ his own militia, which he trains with Deathstroke's help. He also steals all of Batman's schematics to create replicas of his arsenal for his militia to use, and stalks him and his allies to learn their tactics. Jason's final preparation for his revenge against Batman is to forge alliances with several Gotham villains, including Scarecrow, whom he supplies with his militia and knowledge of Batman's tactics.

Injustice 2
As revealed in the prequel comic to the Injustice 2 video game, this version of Jason was murdered by the Joker, with Superman also mentioning him alongside various other Robins to taunt Batman. He was resurrected by Ra's Al Ghul and began working for his cause as an impostor Batman, who uses guns. He is later convinced by Damian Wayne to turn against Ra's when the latter takes it too far by using Amazo to slaughter millions.

Batman: White Knight
In the Batman: White Knight continuity, Jason Todd was the first Robin rather than Dick Grayson. At some point before the events of the comic, he was captured and tortured by the Joker, who wanted to know Batman's secret identity. Harley Quinn stopped him before he could kill Jason and called Batman for help, but by the time they arrived at the hideout where Jason had been held, the Joker had already left with him. Batman was unable to find Jason and eventually assumed he had been killed. Sometime later, after the Joker is cured of his insanity, Harleen tells him about Jason, and Jack Napier (Joker's true identity in this continuity) says that he can't remember what happened to Todd. Dick tells Barbara that Jason was Bruce's favorite. Later, Jack reveals to Batman that he remembered what he did with Jason after he tortured him. Jack reveals that Jason eventually broke from the torture and said "I wish I'd never met Bruce Wayne", and that Joker let Jason go free.  Batman then asks why Jason never returned to him, Jack says that the Joker was jealous of Robin for knowing who Batman was and Jason hated him so much for making him Robin that he disappeared.

In the final issue of the sequel series, Batman: Curse of the White Knight, an adult Jason appears to speak with the recently imprisoned Bruce, arrested after turning himself in for his unintentional crimes as Batman. It's shown that Jason had enlisted in the military sometime after his escape from the Joker. Bruce eventually managed to track him down before his arrest and requested the GCPD appoint Jason as his guard to allow them to talk (though the issue ends before it's shown what they discuss.)

Jason will become the Red Hood in the spin-off series, White Knight Presents Harley Quinn, where he and Harleen work together against the returning Neo-Joker.

He next appears in the third series, Batman: Beyond the White Knight and its spinoff, Batman: White Knight Presents: Red Hood.

Batman: The Adventures Continue
Jason Todd appears in Batman: The Adventures Continue, a comic book series set in the continuity of the DC Animated Universe. Throughout the earlier issues of the series, Jason appears as a mysterious, shadowed figure constantly spying on Batman and his allies. This version has streaks of white hair that used to be brown before the Joker electrocuted him.

During the "Red Son Rising" storyline, Bruce discovers that Jason is alive after finding his fingerprints on his bullets following a battle with the Joker. He now operates as the Red Hood to honor his deceased brother and plans to get revenge on the Joker and Batman.

In other media

Television

Animation

In The New Batman Adventures, Tim Drake has elements of Jason Todd, including his origins as a young thief living on the streets and the son of a criminal who is one of Two-Face's henchmen. Originally, the storyline Batman: A Death in the Family was to be adapted into the series, with Tim being killed by the Joker just like Jason in the comics, but the idea was ultimately abandoned because it was too dark for a children's series. Still, a variation of the story appeared in the animated film Batman Beyond: Return of the Joker; although the Joker does not kill Tim, he still physically and mentally tortures him to insanity and is thus responsible for ending his superhero career. This variation was later adapted into Arkhamverse Jason's history.
 Jason Todd is alluded to in the Teen Titans animated series. In the episode "X", he is listed by Beast Boy as one of Red X's theoretical identities.
 Jason Todd has a cameo appearance in a New Teen Titans short on DC Nation, as one of Red X's disguises.
 Jason Todd makes a cameo in Batman: The Brave and the Bold episode, Emperor Joker! where Bat-Mite shows Batman a museum dedicated to his and Joker's rivalry, including a statue of Batman holding Jason Todd's body, referencing how the fans voted to decide Jason's fate during A Death in the Family and implies that he voted for his death. 
 Jason Todd appears in Young Justice. During the five years after season one, it is revealed that Jason became Dick Grayson's replacement as Robin on the team, but died under unknown circumstances with Tim Drake as his successor. In Young Justice: Invasion, a hologram of Jason can be seen in the grotto for deceased heroes in many episodes, including "Satisfaction", "Darkest" and "Endgame". In Young Justice: Outsiders, a red-hooded ninja, voiced by Josh Keaton, is shown working for Ra's al Ghul. When Geo-Force, Halo and Forager come to Infinity Island to find Brion's sister, Tara, the Ninja and Sensei rush to attack them. After Nightwing and the Team arrived to rescue them, the Red-Hooded Ninja muttered, "Grayson," hinting at his identity as Ra's became satisfied that he was starting to regain his memories. He then appeared in Young Justice: Phantoms, where he helped defend Infinity Island and Ra's al Ghul from Cheshire. 
Jason Todd is mentioned in the Harley Quinn second season episode, "All the Best Inmates Have Daddy Issues," when Joker mockingly references how he killed Jason when Batman interrogates him. He's later alluded to in the Season 3 episode "The 83rd Annual Villy Awards", as Joker beats up an actor playing him with a crowbar, referencing the actual Jason's death.

Live-action
 Jason Todd is mentioned by Barbara Gordon in the Birds of Prey episode "Slick".
 Jason Todd makes his live-action debut in the 2018 television series Titans, portrayed by Curran Walters. He is introduced in the first season as the second Robin following Dick Grayson's departure from the mantle. After helping the Titans defeat the demonic Trigon, Jason joins the new Titans formed by Dick, Koriand'r, Rachel Roth, and Garfield Logan at Batman's request, but eventually leaves the team by the end of the show's second season. In the third season, Jason becomes the Red Hood after being killed by the Joker and resurrected by Scarecrow via a Lazarus Pit, being controlled by him with a special chemical. Originally a murderous vigilante seeking to ruin the Titans and help Scarecrow take over Gotham City, Jason eventually breaks free of Scarecrow's control and assists the Titans in taking him down.
 Walters reprises his role in the 2019-2020 annual Arrowverse crossover Crisis on Infinite Earths in stock footage showcasing his Earth, later designated as Earth-9, being erased from antimatter. However, it is later restored when Oliver Queen sacrifices himself to restore the multiverse.

Film

Animation

 Jason Todd makes his animated debut in the 2010 animated film Batman: Under the Red Hood, with the Red Hood voiced by Jensen Ackles and Robin voiced by Vincent Martella (as a teenager) and Alexander Martella (as a child). Jason first met Batman when he stole the Batmobile's tires in Crime Alley, which took him in to take up the Robin mantle after Dick Grayson became Nightwing. Though gifted in both mind and body, time passed and Jason grew increasingly violent, not understanding why his mentor did not kill the criminals they faced. When Ra's al Ghul hired the Joker to distract the Dynamic Duo, Robin sought to kill the Joker while Batman fought his goons. However, the Joker had set a trap and captured Jason before brutally killing him. Feeling guilt for inadvertently causing Jason's death, Ra's retrieved his body and resurrected him with a Lazarus Pit. However, the effects drove Jason insane, and he subsequently disappeared after escaping Ra's compound. Five years later, he returns to Gotham City under the Red Hood alias, convincing all of Gotham's gangsters to join him in overtaking Gotham's most powerful crime lord, Black Mask. After capturing the Joker, Jason lures Batman to an abandoned building where the three of them exchange words. Jason states that he forgave Batman for not saving him, but is angered that Batman had allowed the Joker to live, and continue murdering for years after his death; Todd thinks his own death should have been the final straw. After Batman disarms Jason, the former Boy Wonder activates explosives placed throughout the building, resulting in Batman apprehending the Joker once more. After the explosion, Jason's body is nowhere to be found, leaving his fate ambiguous.
 Jason Todd has a cameo appearance in the 2016 animated film Batman: The Killing Joke. A picture of Robin's beaten body is shown in the Batcave.
 Three boys named Dick, Jason and Tim appear in Batman: Gotham by Gaslight trying to rob a couple before being stopped by Batman. Jason is voiced by Grey Griffin.
 A Feudal Japan version of Jason Todd/Red Hood appears in the anime film Batman Ninja, voiced by Akira Ishida and Yuri Lowenthal in Japanese and English respectively.
 Jason Todd as Red Hood appears in Lego DC Batman: Family Matters, voiced by Jason Spisak. This version left Batman due to believing that he did not care about him, and later became Red Hood to exact revenge on him and his allies.
 Jason Todd appears in the interactive film adaptation of Batman: Death in the Family, which is a follow-up to Batman: Under the Red Hood, with Vincent Martella reprising his role. Much like the 900 number toll of the original storyline, the film allows the viewers multiple options to choose from to determine Jason's fate. If they choose for Jason to die, the events of Batman: Under the Red Hood play out naturally. If they choose for Jason to cheat death, the trauma from his injuries and resentment towards Bruce and the Bat-Family for their effect on him leads him to get revenge by becoming Hush. If they choose for Batman to sacrifice himself to save Jason, Jason either attempts to avenge Bruce by becoming Red Robin or to uphold Bruce's moral code as the Red Hood.

Live action

 The fallen Robin referenced in the DC Extended Universe was long stated by Warner Bros. to be Jason Todd. Following a behind-the-scenes video was released for the DC Extended Universe, it was further stated by Warner Bros. the suit belonged to Jason who was killed by the Joker before the events of Batman v Superman: Dawn of Justice and was labeled as such at the Warner Bros. Studio Tour Hollywood. However, according to director Zack Snyder later on, the suit was originally intended to belong to Dick Grayson but this was changed due to the studio beginning the development of a Nightwing film. A prop for Dick's grave was created but it is not visible in the film. He also elaborated that had he stayed with the franchise, Robin would "stay dead...till Carrie. Jason is referenced in the behind the scenes prep for Killer Croc's file from Suicide Squad, in which it is mentioned that he killed Jason's family, prompting Jason to become the second Robin, just like his original backstory in the comics.

Video games
 Jason Todd as Red Hood appears as an iconic gear set style called "Gotham's Outlaw" in DC Universe Online.
 Jason Todd as Red Hood is one of the four main playable characters in the 2022 video game Gotham Knights, voiced by Stephen Oyoung.

Lego
 Jason Todd as Red Hood is a playable character in Lego Batman 2: DC Super Heroes.
 Jason Todd as Red Hood is a playable character in Lego Batman 3: Beyond Gotham, voiced by Troy Baker.
 Jason Todd as Red Hood is a playable character in Lego DC Super-Villains, with Cameron Bowen reprising his role from Injustice 2.

Batman: Arkham
Jason Todd appears in the Rocksteady Studios' Batman: Arkham series, voiced again by Troy Baker.
 Jason is indirectly mentioned in Batman: Arkham City. When playing as Tim Drake on a specific challenge map, before the start of the first round, Clayface-Joker may randomly say "Didn't I kill you already? no? Well there's always next time, right?" referencing his supposed murder of Jason.
 Jason appears in Batman: Arkham Knight. Flashbacks during the game reveal that he was captured and tortured by the Joker during his tenure as the second Robin (an idea taken from Tim Drake's story in Batman Beyond: Return of the Joker), to break his will and turn him against Batman. After months of torture, the Joker filmed himself shooting Jason, and later sent the footage to Batman to torment him; Batman took the videotape as evidence that Jason had died, and stopped searching for him. Near the end of the main story, Jason is revealed as the identity of the game's titular antagonist, the Arkham Knight, who had been helping Scarecrow by supplying him with his soldiers and telling him everything he knows about Batman's tactics and arsenal. By the end of the game, he abandons his Arkham Knight persona, becomes the Red Hood, and has seemingly forgiven Batman, as he comes to his aid during the final confrontation with Scarecrow. 
The Red Hood is a playable character via downloadable content. He was included in his self-titled expansion pack, which also features four challenge maps and a story-driven mission for the character. The mission, set after the events of Arkham Knight, follows the Red Hood as he tracks down and kills Black Mask. The Red Hood was eventually made available for all of the game's challenge maps via an update, with the Arkham Knight available as an alternate costume.
 The videotape of the Joker "killing" Jason can be viewed in Batman: Arkham VR.

Injustice
 Jason Todd as Arkham Knight is a playable character in the mobile app version of Injustice: Gods Among Us.
 Jason Todd as Red Hood is a playable character in downloadable content in Injustice 2, voiced by Cameron Bowen. He is also briefly mentioned in the story during Damian Wayne's argument with Batman when the former reminds the Dark Knight of all the people who died at the Joker's hands. In his Arcade ending, following his defeat of Brainiac, the Red Hood refuses to take either Batman or Superman's side; while he prefers the latter's lethal methods of dealing with criminals, he doesn't agree with Superman's dictatorial rule. As such, while the World's Finest are busy fighting each other, the Red Hood focuses on protecting the weak and innocent in his way.

See also

 List of DC Comics characters
 Robin (character)

References

External links

Red Hood at DC Comics' official website
 
 Red Hood (Jason Todd) at the DC Database Project

Batman characters
Characters created by Don Newton
Characters created by Gerry Conway
DC Comics sidekicks
Comics characters introduced in 1983
DC Comics film characters
DC Comics male superheroes
DC Comics male supervillains
DC Comics martial artists
DC Comics orphans
DC Comics child superheroes
Fictional acrobats
Fictional blade and dart throwers
Fictional crime bosses
Fictional detectives
Fictional kidnappers
Fictional marksmen and snipers
Fictional gunfighters in comics
Fictional mass murderers
Fictional characters with post-traumatic stress disorder
Fictional stalkers
Fighting game characters
Red Hood
Robin (character)
Superheroes who are adopted
Fictional murdered people
Vigilante characters in comics